Stretchable electronics, also known as elastic electronics or elastic circuits, is a group of technologies for building electronic circuits by depositing or embedding electronic devices and circuits onto stretchable substrates such as silicones or polyurethanes, to make a completed circuit that can experience large  strains without failure. In the simplest case, stretchable electronics can be made by using the same components used for rigid printed circuit boards, with the rigid substrate cut (typically in a serpentine pattern) to enable in-plane stretchability. However, many researchers have also sought intrinsically stretchable conductors, such as liquid metals.

One of the major challenges in this domain is designing the substrate and the interconnections to be stretchable, rather than flexible (see Flexible electronics) or rigid (Printed Circuit Boards). Typically, polymers are chosen as substrates or material to embed. 
When bending the substrate, the outermost radius of the bend will stretch (see  Strain in an Euler–Bernoulli beam, subjecting the interconnects to high mechanical strain. Stretchable electronics often attempts biomimicry of human skin and flesh, in being stretchable, whilst retaining full functionality. The design space for products is opened up with stretchable electronics, including sensitive electronic skin for robotic devices  and in vivo implantable sponge-like electronics.

Applications

Energy 

Several stretchable energy storage devices and supercapacitors are made using carbon-based materials such as single-walled carbon nanotubes (SWCNTs). A study by Li et al. showed a stretchable supercapacitor (composed of buckled SWCNTs macrofilm and elastomeric separators on an elastic PDMS substrate), that performed dynamic charging and discharging. The key drawback of this stretchable energy storage technology is the low specific capacitance and energy density, although this can potentially be improved by the incorporation of redox materials, for example the SWNT/MnO2 electrode. Another approach to creating a stretchable energy storage device is the use of Origami folding principles. The resulting origami battery achieved significant linear and areal deformability, large twistability and bendability.

Medicine 

Stretchable electronics could be integrated into smart garments to interact seamlessly with the human body and detect diseases or collect patient data in a non-invasive manner. For example, researchers from Seoul National University and MC10 (a flexible-electronics company) have developed a patch that is able to detect glucose levels in sweat and can deliver the medicine needed on demand (insulin or metformin). The patch consists of graphene riddled with gold particles and contains sensors that are able to detect temperature, pH level, glucose, and humidity.
Stretchable electronics also permit developers to create soft robots, to implement minimally invasive surgeries in hospitals. Especially when it comes to surgeries of the brain and every millimeter is important, such robots may have a more precise scope of action than a human.

Tactile Sensing 
Rigid electronics doesn't typically conform well to soft, biological organisms and tissue. Since stretchable electronics is not limited by this, some researchers try to implement it as sensors for touch, or tactile sensing. One way of achieving this is to make an array of conductive OFET (Organic Field Effect Transistors) forming a network that can detect local changes in capacitance, which gives the user information about where the contact occurred. This could have potential use in robotics and virtual reality applications.

See also 
 Flexible electronics
 Soft robotics
 Stretch sensor

References

External links 
 
 
 

Electronics manufacturing
Electronic engineering